The Shogawa Goguchi Dam is a gravity dam on the Shō River in Shogawa, Toyama Prefecture, Japan. It was constructed between 1934 and 1939. The dam has an associated 23.4 MW hydroelectric power station which was commissioned in two stages, December 1939 and March 1967. Of the nine dams on the Shō River it is the furthest downstream.

See also

Wadagawa Dam – downstream on a tributary of the Shō River

References

Dams in Toyama Prefecture
Gravity dams
Dams completed in 1939
Dams on the Shō River
Hydroelectric power stations in Japan